The Healing may refer to:

 The Healing (album), by Strange Fruit Project, 2006
 The Healing (film), a 2012 Filipino horror suspense film
 "The Healing" (song), by Blanca and Dante Bowe, 2022
 The Healing (sr), a 2014 Serbian film by Ivan Jovic

See also
 
 Healing (disambiguation)